Bai Mudan or Baimudan or White Peony may refer to:

Baimudan tea, white tea made from the Camellia sinensis plant
Bai Mudan (mythology), character from Chinese mythology, lover of the Taoist immortal Lü Dongbin
 Bai Mudan (1900–1968), Peking opera actor later known as Xun Huisheng

See also
 Peony